Kassem Gharaibeh (born October 10, 1983) is an American Internet personality and host of  Attack of the Show! His YouTube channel Kassem G hosts several hundred videos, most notably the California On, Going Deep and Street Music webseries. He won the 2013 Streamy Award for Best Host for his work on California On.

Early life
Gharaibeh was born in Amman to an Egyptian mother and a Jordanian father. He lived in Saudi Arabia at a very young age then moved to Florida when he was four years old. He grew up in Ventura County, California. Before his YouTube career, Gharaibeh was working at a Best Buy and doing stand-up comedy on the weekends, mostly performing in small venues like restaurants.

Career 
Gharaibeh got the idea to start making YouTube videos when his friend Cory Williams had a video that went viral.  After working in retail for 10 years, Gharaibeh finally quit his job and began making videos full-time. In 2011, he co-starred in the YouTube film, Agents of Secret Stuff starring Ryan Higa as Mr. Anderson.

He won the 2013 Streamy Award for Best Host, beating out four other nominees including Larry King. He has appeared on the cannabis culture-oriented podcast Getting Doug with High six times. He also appeared in a brief role in the 2014 film Transformers: Age of Extinction. In 2009, he co-founded Maker Studios along with Shay Butler, Danny Zappin and Lisa Donovan. 

On March 24, 2014, Maker Studios accepted a buyout offer from The Walt Disney Company for $500 million, rising to $950 million if financial milestones were met. In September 2019, he began hosting a podcast called Pajama Pants alongside The Sopranos stars Robert Iler and Jamie-Lynn Sigler. In March 2021, he made most of his YouTube videos private and not viewable by the public. In a podcast, he explained that as he got older he began to no longer identify with the videos he made earlier in his life, and found many of them offensive and unfunny. In April 2021, he was revealed to be a new host of G4 as part of their relaunch later that year, and in November he was announced to be a host of their revival of Attack of the Show!.

References

External links
 

1983 births
Living people
21st-century American comedians
American people of Egyptian descent
American people of Jordanian descent
American stand-up comedians
American YouTubers
Comedy-related YouTube channels
Comedy YouTubers
English-language YouTube channels
Maker Studios channels
Maker Studios people
People from Newbury Park, California
YouTube channels launched in 2006